Cranford-Wannamaker House is a historic home located at Durham, Durham County, North Carolina.   It was built in 1891 by local contractor T.S. Christian, and is a two-story, Shingle Style dwelling.

It was listed on the National Register of Historic Places in 1979. It is located in the Trinity Historic District.

References

Houses on the National Register of Historic Places in North Carolina
Shingle Style architecture in North Carolina
Houses completed in 1891
Houses in Durham, North Carolina
National Register of Historic Places in Durham County, North Carolina
Individually listed contributing properties to historic districts on the National Register in North Carolina